The 1935 Tour de France was the 29th edition of the Tour de France, one of cycling's Grand Tours. The Tour began in Paris with a flat stage on 4 July, and Stage 12 occurred on 17 July with a flat stage to Marseille. The race finished in Paris on 28 July.

Stage 1
4 July 1935 – Paris to Lille,

Stage 2
5 July 1935 – Lille to Charleville,

Stage 3
6 July 1935 – Charleville to Metz,

Stage 4
7 July 1935 – Metz to Belfort,

Stage 5a
8 July 1935 – Belfort to Geneva,

Stage 5b
8 July 1935 – Geneva to Evian,  (ITT)

Rest day 1
9 July 1935 – Evian

Stage 6
10 July 1935 – Evian to Aix-les-Bains,

Stage 7
11 July 1935 – Aix-les-Bains to Grenoble,

Stage 8
12 July 1935 – Grenoble to Gap,

Stage 9
13 July 1935 – Gap to Digne,

Stage 10
14 July 1935 – Digne to Nice,

Rest day 2
15 July 1935 – Nice

Stage 11
16 July 1935 – Nice to Cannes,

Stage 12
17 July 1935 – Cannes to Marseille,

References

1935 Tour de France
Tour de France stages